Mart Paama (17 January 1938 – 29 June 2006) was an Estonian athlete. He competed in the men's javelin throw at the 1960 Summer Olympics and the 1968 Summer Olympics, representing the Soviet Union.

References

1938 births
2006 deaths
Athletes (track and field) at the 1960 Summer Olympics
Athletes (track and field) at the 1968 Summer Olympics
Estonian male javelin throwers
Olympic athletes of the Soviet Union
Sportspeople from Tartu
Soviet male javelin throwers